Prince Roman (Revaz) Ivanovich Bagration (Roman (Revaz) Bagrat'ioni) (1778 – 1834) was a Georgian nobleman and a general in the Imperial Russian Army. A scion of the Georgian royal family Bagrationi, he was a brother of Pyotr Bagration, a notable Russian commander during the Napoleonic Wars.

Son of Prince Ivan Aleksandrovich Bagration.

Career 
Born in Kizlyar, Dagestan, Roman Bagration enrolled in the Chuguevsk Cossack regiment as an uryadnik (a Cossack NCO) at the age of 13 (1791). He saw his first action during the Persian Expedition of 1796 under Count Zubov and took part in the capture of Derbent. In 1802, he was commissioned in the Leib Guard Hussar regiment as a poruchik and fought against Napoleonic France during the 1805 War of the Third Coalition. At the request of his brother, Prince Bagration, he arrived, in 1806, in Georgia, to meet with a delegation of local nobility, which submitted him a petition expressing dissatisfaction with the Russian administration. Bagration was promptly recalled from Georgia, and sent to the army operating against the French in Prussia (1807).

From 1809 to 1810, he volunteered in the Danube Army and took part in the war against the Ottoman Empire, being promoted to colonel in 1810. During Napoleon's invasion of Russia (1812), he served in the 3rd Western Army and fought in the battles of Kobryn, Brest, and Gorodechno. For his valor in the Battle of Bautzen (1813), he received the rank of major general. He was then present at the sieges of Dresden, Hamburg, and Harburg (1813-1814).

In the 1820s, he served in the Caucasus and took part in the wars against Turkey and Persia. He played a prominent role in the storming of Erivan, a Persian-held city of Armenia, in 1827 during the Russo-Persian War (1826-1828), and was elevated to the rank of lieutenant general in 1829. After the war, he settled in Tiflis where his mansion was frequented by the local elites and housed, in 1831, the first public performance of Woe from Wit, a play by Alexander Griboyedov, in which Bagration played the role of Colonel Skalozub.

In 1832, Bagration was sent to Abkhazia where he became ill of fever and died in Tiflis (1834). He is buried at St. David Church, Tbilisi, Georgia.

Family 
Prince Roman Bagration was married to Anna Semyonovna Ivanova (1799–1875). They had five children:
 Prince Pyotr (1818–1876), statesman, general and scientist. 
 Prince Ivan (1824–1860).
 Princess Aleksandra (born 1829; died in infancy).
 Princess Anna
 Princess Elizaveta (was born in Izyum city, Ukraine on April 20, 1820, died 1867), married to General Baron Aleksandr Belendorf.

References 

1778 births
1834 deaths
People from Kizlyar
House of Mukhrani
Knights of Malta
People of the Russo-Persian Wars
Russian commanders of the Napoleonic Wars
Imperial Russian Army generals
Georgian generals in the Imperial Russian Army
Georgian lieutenant generals (Imperial Russia)
Recipients of the Order of St. George of the Third Degree
Russian military personnel of the Caucasian War
Russian princes